David Calderhead Jr. (25 October 1889 – 15 January 1965) was a Scottish professional football player and manager.

Career
Calderhead played for Lincoln City, Chelsea and Leicester Fosse.

Calderhead later managed Lincoln City from April 1921 to May 1924.

Personal life
His father was David Calderhead, who was also a football player and manager, notable for managing Chelsea for 26 years.

References

1889 births
1965 deaths
Scottish footballers
Scottish football managers
Lincoln City F.C. players
Chelsea F.C. players
Leicester City F.C. players
English Football League players
Lincoln City F.C. managers

Association footballers not categorized by position